Milen is a Bulgarian masculine given name. Notable people with the name include:

Milen Bonev (born 1986), Bulgarian football player, currently playing for Kaliakra Kavarna as a defender
Milen Dobrev (born 1980), Bulgarian weightlifter
Milen Hristov (born 1977), Bulgarian footballer who currently plays for Neftochimic Burgas as a midfielder
Milen Lahchev (born 1987), Bulgarian footballer, currently playing as a defender for Lokomotiv Sofia
Milen Nachev, Bulgarian/American conductor and Principal Guest Conductor with the Romanian National Radio Symphony Orchestra & Choir
Milen Petkov (born 1974), Bulgarian football player currently playing for Dobrudzha Dobrich
Milen Radukanov (born 1972), former Bulgarian footballer, who currently manages Botev Plovdiv
Milen Ruskov (1966), Bulgarian writer and translator
Milen Tanev (born 1987), Bulgarian footballer, currently playing for Beroe as a midfielder
Milen Tsvetkov (born 1966), Bulgarian journalist and TV host
Milen Vasilev, Bulgarian football player, currently playing for Minyor Pernik as a midfielder
Milen Veltchev (born 1966), the finance minister of Bulgaria from 2001 until 2005

Masculine given names
Slavic masculine given names
Bulgarian masculine given names
it:Milen
pl:Milen